Rhynchostele is a genus of flowering plants from the orchid family, Orchidaceae, native to Mexico, Central America and Venezuela.
The genus name is abbreviated as Rst. in the horticultural trade.

Species
At the present time (May 2014), 19 species are accepted.
	 	
Rhynchostele aptera (Lex.) Soto Arenas & Salazar - from Durango to Oaxaca	
Rhynchostele bictoniensis (Bateman) Soto Arenas & Salazar - from Oaxaca to Panama	
Rhynchostele candidula (Rchb.f.) Soto Arenas & Salazar - Oaxaca
Rhynchostele cervantesii (Lex.) Soto Arenas & Salazar - Oaxaca	
Rhynchostele cervantesii subsp. cervantesii - Oaxaca
Rhynchostele cervantesii subsp. halbingeriana Soto Arenas & Hágsater - Oaxaca
Rhynchostele cervantesii subsp. membranacea (Lindl.) Soto Arenas & Salazar - Oaxaca	
Rhynchostele cordata (Lindl.) Soto Arenas & Salazar - from Puebla to Costa Rica, plus Venezuela	
Rhynchostele ehrenbergii (Link, Klotzsch & Otto) Soto Arenas & Salazar - from Hidalgo to Oaxaca	
Rhynchostele galeottiana (A.Rich.) Soto Arenas & Salazar - Oaxaca	
Rhynchostele hortensiae (R.L.Rodr.) Soto Arenas & Salazar - Costa Rica	
Rhynchostele × humeana (Rchb.f.) Soto Arenas & Salazar - Oaxaca
Rhynchostele londesboroughiana (Rchb.f.) Soto Arenas & Salazar - Guerrero	
Rhynchostele maculata (Lex.) Soto Arenas & Salazar	
Rhynchostele maculata subsp. maculata - Oaxaca	
Rhynchostele maculata subsp. oestlundiana (L.O.Williams) Soto Arenas & R.Jiménez - from Veracruz to Costa Rica
Rhynchostele maculata f. perotensis Soto Arenas & R.Jiménez - Veracruz, Puebla
Rhynchostele madrensis (Rchb.f.) Soto Arenas & Salazar - Oaxaca	
Rhynchostele majalis (Rchb.f.) Soto Arenas & Salazar - from Tabasco to Guatemala	
Rhynchostele oscarii Archila - Guatemala	
Rhynchostele pygmaea (Lindl.) Rchb.f. - Guatemala and Chiapas	
Rhynchostele rossii (Lindl.) Soto Arenas & Salazar - from Querétaro to Nicaragua
Rhynchostele stellata (Lindl.) Soto Arenas & Salazar - from Chiapas to Costa Rica, plus Venezuela
Rhynchostele uroskinneri (Lindl.) Soto Arenas & Salazar - Guatemala and Chiapas
Rhynchostele × vexativa (Rchb.f.) Soto Arenas & Salazar - collected somewhere in Mexico c 1875, now probably extinct

See also
 List of Orchidaceae genera
 × Oncostele, a hybrid genus with at least one Rhynchostele ancestor

References

 Pridgeon, A.M., Cribb, P.J., Chase, M.C. & Rasmussen, F. eds. (2009). Epidendroideae (Part two). Genera Orchidacearum 5: 340 ff. Oxford University Press.
 Berg Pana, H. 2005. Handbuch der Orchideen-Namen. Dictionary of Orchid Names. Dizionario dei nomi delle orchidee. Ulmer, Stuttgart

External links

Orchidroots.org Rhynchostele Species

Oncidiinae genera
Oncidiinae
Orchids of Mexico
Orchids of Venezuela
Orchids of Guatemala
Orchids of Honduras
Orchids of El Salvador
Orchids of Nicaragua
Orchids of Costa Rica
Orchids of Panama